Mamadou Diakité may refer to:

 Mamadou Diakité (footballer) (born 1985), Malian footballer
 Mamadou Diakité (politician) (born 1950), Malian politician